Verity Spott (born 1987) is an English neo-modernist poet. Spott lives in Brighton and co-runs the long running poetry, music and performance event Horseplay. Verity teaches poetry with New Writing South and The Creative Writing Programme. Alongside James Burton Verity co-edits the Brighton based poetry magazine "Fatberg". 

Gideon (2014) was a poem organized as a hex, an idea returned to in We Will Bury You (2017). The long poem Click Away Close Door Say (2017) explored the effect of the United Kingdom government austerity programme on Spott's job in a care unit for young adults with autism.

Verity Spott's work has been translated into French, German, Spanish, Dutch, Portuguese and Greek. 

Spott has a degree in English Literature and Creative writing from the University of Chichester and an MA in Critical Writing from the University of Sussex. From 2018 to 2019 Spott was poet in residence at the University of Surrey.

Works
 Three Poems. (Broadside) London: Sender Broken, 2013.
 Effort to No. Brighton: Iodine, 2013.
 (with Jonny Liron) Dear Nothing and No One in It. Brighton: Iodine, 2013.
 Gideon. London: Barque Press, 2014.
(with Megan Alan) Three Poems, Edinburgh Sad Press, 2014.
 Balconette. Guildford: Veer Books, 2014. 
 9 11 16. Brighton: Iodine, 2016.
 We Will Bury You. Guildford: Veer Books, 2017. 
 Click Away Close Door Say. Contraband Books, 2017. 
Kate's Dream Diamond Anti Fatigue Matting Surface. Crater, 2017. 
 (with Timothy Thornton) Poems. Face Press, 2017.
 The Mutiny Aboard the RV Felicity. Tipped Press, 2018.
 Prayers, Manifestos, Bravery. London: Pilot Press, 2018.
Caterpillars. TL:DR Press, 2019.
Poems of Sappho. Face Press, 2019.
 Prayers, Manifestos, Bravery. London: Pilot Press, (second edition), 2020.
Hopelessness. London: The 87 Press, 2020. 
Coronelles Set 1. London: Veer Books, 2020.
70 Sonnets. Brighton: Hove Space Program, 2021.
Désolation (French translation of Hopelessness). Lyon, Même pas l'hiver, 2022.
Woodvale (written collaboratively by "The Beam-Eye Babies"). Brighton, The Minutes Press, 2022.
Songs of the Morning. London: Slub Press, 2023.

External links
 Two Torn Halves, poet's blog

References

1987 births
Living people
Alumni of the University of Sussex
21st-century English poets